Nargana Wilderness Area is a 98,999 ha reserve in Guna Yala, Panama run by the Kuna people. It is known for its bird watching opportunities and is home to black-crowned antpitta, speckled antshrike, and red-throated caracara.

See also
Protected areas of Panama

References

Protected areas of Panama
Guna Yala